This list of theatrical animated feature films consists of animated films released theatrically, whether wide or limited, in the United States, since 2020.

Made-for-TV and direct-to-video films will not be featured on this list, unless they have had a theatrical release in some form.

Primarily live-action films with heavy use of special effects are also included.

Films

Released

Upcoming

See also 
 List of American theatrical animated feature films (1937-1999)
 List of American theatrical animated feature films (2000-2019)
 List of Disney theatrical animated feature films
 List of 20th Century Studios theatrical animated feature films
 List of Universal Pictures theatrical animated feature films
 List of Paramount Pictures theatrical animated feature films
 List of Sony theatrical animated feature films
 List of Warner Bros. theatrical animated feature films
 List of Metro-Goldwyn-Mayer theatrical animated feature films
 List of Lionsgate theatrical animated feature films
 List of anime theatrically released in the United States

References

External links 
 List of fully animated features theatrically released in the United States, compiled by Jerry Beck

 2000
 2000
Feature
Lists of 2020s films
2020s American films